The 1992 Pan American Race Walking Cup was held in Ciudad de Guatemala, Guatemala, on 17–18 October.  The track of the Cup runs in the Avenida de la Reforma.

Complete results, medal winners until 2011, and the results for the Mexican athletes were published.

Medallists

Results

Men's 20 km

Team

Men's 50 km

Team

Women's 10 km

Team

Participation
The participation of 64 athletes from 9 countries is reported.

 (3)
 (5)
 (2)
 (5)
 (11)
 (5)
 México (15)
 (1)
 (15)

See also
 1992 Race Walking Year Ranking

References

Pan American Race Walking Cup
Pan American Race Walking Cup
Pan American Race Walking Cup
International athletics competitions hosted by Guatemala